Crazy Knights (also known as Ghost Crazy) is a 1944 American comedy horror film directed by William Beaudine and starring Billy Gilbert, Shemp Howard and Max Rosenbloom.

Plot
Billy Gilbert, Shemp Howard and Dave Hammond (Bernard Sell) manage a carnival act with a live gorilla named Barny with Shemp posing as the gorilla during the actual act.  While driving to their next carnival performance, they are side tracked by picking up stranded Mr. Gardner (John Hamilton) and his daughter Joan Gardner (Jayne Hazard) whom Dave seems quite smitten with. Joan's father is convinced that someone is trying to kill him and the actions of his suspicious secretary, Mr. Williams (Tay Dunn) seem to confirm this.  Gardner insists that the carnival trio take him and his entourage to one of his residences that is close by, though his daughter is upset by the idea. The Gardner's chauffeur (Max Rosenbloom) is left to stay with their broken down car.

When they arrive at the Gardner estate, they are met by a mysterious and strange house servant Mrs. Benson (Minerva Urical) and an Electrician (Dan White) who is roaming about the house. Billy and Shemp are terrorized by ghostly voices, transforming pictures and figures dressed in sheets.  Maxie finally arrives at the estate shortly after a suspicious character named Mr. Grogan (Tim Ryan) does.  As things get stranger, Maxie teams up with Gilbert and Howard, Shemp dons the gorilla outfit and Barny the real gorilla gets free from his mobile cage trailer. Soon after a body is discovered and it is clearly a case of murder. The film is 63 minutes with the story wrapping up in the final two minutes. Billy Gilbert, Shemp Howard and Max "Maxie" Rosenbloom all use their actual names in the movie. The alternate title for this movie is "Ghost Crazy".

Cast
 Billy Gilbert as Billy  
 Shemp Howard as Shemp  
 Max Rosenbloom as Maxie 
 Tim Ryan as Grogan  
 Jayne Hazard as Joan Gardner  
 Tay Dunn as Ralph Williams  
 Minerva Urecal as Mrs. Benson 
 John Hamilton as Mr. Gardner  
 Bernard Sell as Dave Hammon 
 Betty Sinclair as Girl  
 Buster Brodie as Baldy  
 Art Miles as Barney the Gorilla  
 Dan White as Electrician

See also
List of American films of 1944

References

Bibliography
 Rigby, Jonathan. American Gothic: Sixty Years of Horror Cinema. Reynolds & Hearn, 2007. 
 Marshall, Wendy L. William Beaudine: From Silents to Television. Scarecrow Press, 2005.

External links

1944 films
American comedy horror films
American black-and-white films
1940s comedy horror films
1940s English-language films
Films directed by William Beaudine
Monogram Pictures films
1944 horror films
1944 comedy films
1940s American films